Hitchens Pond is located east of Barber Point, New York. Fish species present in the lake are white sucker, yellow perch, and black bullhead. Carry down access from County Road 421 to an old railroad bed past Horseshoe Lake.

References

Lakes of New York (state)
Lakes of St. Lawrence County, New York